Anton Subikshan (born 6 January 1998) is an Indian cricketer. He made his List A debut on 21 February 2021, for Puducherry in the 2020–21 Vijay Hazare Trophy.

References

External links
 

1998 births
Living people
Indian cricketers
Pondicherry cricketers
Place of birth missing (living people)